

Season summary
Extremadura finished the season in 17th place. Although this was the club's highest-ever finish in the Spanish football pyramid (the season was only the second Extremadura had played in the top flight), they still finished one point adrift of safety. Extremadura thus qualified for the relegation play-off, where they faced the fifth-placed team of the Segunda División, Rayo Vallecano. The Madrid-based side easily defeated Extremadura 2-0 both home and away for a 4-0 aggregate win which saw Extremadura relegated after a single season in the top flight of Spanish football. Manager Rafael Benítez resigned after only two seasons in charge, deciding to instead study in Italy and England.

On the plus side, Extremadura won the Fair Play award.

Squad
Squad at end of season

Left club during season

La Liga

League table

Transfers

In

Summer window 
  Toni Velamazán, from  Barcelona
 On June 30 Barcelona accepted Extremadura's three-year offer for Velamazán after loaning him to Oviedo and Albacete in the two previous seasons. It kept a repurchase option for two years.

Winter window

Unsuccessful attempts

Out

See also
CF Extremadura
1998–99 La Liga
1998–99 Copa del Rey

References

CF Extremadura seasons
Extremadura